SCH-58261 is a drug which acts as a potent and selective antagonist for the adenosine receptor A2A, with more than 50x selectivity for A2A over other adenosine receptors. It has been used to investigate the mechanism of action of caffeine, which is a mixed A1 / A2A antagonist, and has shown that the A2A receptor is primarily responsible for the stimulant and ergogenic effects of caffeine, but blockade of both A1 and A2A receptors is required to accurately replicate caffeine's effects in animals. SCH-58261 has also shown antidepressant, nootropic and neuroprotective effects in a variety of animal models, and has been investigated as a possible treatment for Parkinson's disease.

See also 
 CGS-15943
 Istradefylline (KW-6002)

References 

Adenosine receptor antagonists
Experimental drugs